Ulisse Ciocchi or Giocchi or Giuocchi (circa 1570 - 1631) was an Italian painter of the Mannerism, active in Florence.

Little is known about his biography. He was born in Monte San Savino near Arezzo. He painted in the convent of San Jacopo a Ripoli and Santo Spirito in Florence. A Ulisse Ciocchi painted the lunettes over the entrance to Santa Maria Novella, may have been Giovanni Maria Ciocchi's son.

References

1570s births
1631 deaths
People from Arezzo
16th-century Italian painters
Italian male painters
17th-century Italian painters
Painters from Florence
Ulisse